Bartosz Rudyk (born 18 September 1998) is a Polish racing cyclist, who currently rides for UCI Continental team . He rode in the men's individual pursuit event at the 2018 UCI Track Cycling World Championships.

Major results

Track

2016
 2nd  Team pursuit, UEC European Junior Championships
2017
 National Championships
2nd Individual pursuit
3rd Madison
 3rd  Team pursuit, UEC European Under-23 Championships
2018
 National Championships
2nd Madison
2nd Team pursuit
2019
 1st  Team pursuit, National Championships
2020
 UEC European Under-23 Championships
1st  Scratch
3rd  Madison (with Filip Prokopyszyn)
2021
 1st  Individual pursuit, National Championships

Road
2016
 6th Overall La Coupe du Président de la Ville de Grudziądz
1st Stage 4
2021
 6th Puchar Ministra Obrony Narodowej
2022
 5th Grand Prix Wyszków
 5th Umag Trophy

References

External links

1998 births
Living people
Polish male cyclists
Polish track cyclists
Sportspeople from Wrocław
21st-century Polish people